Not to be confused with process area, a physical place in an industrial processes
The Capability Maturity Model Integration (CMMI) defines a process area as, "a cluster of related practices in an area that, when implemented collectively, satisfies a set of goals considered important for making improvement in that area."  Both CMMI for Development v1.3 and CMMI for Acquisition v1.3 identify 22 process areas, whereas CMMI for Services v1.3 identifies 24 process areas.  Many of the process areas are the same in these three models. 

 Process Area Organization 
In CMMI models, the process areas are organized in alphabetical order according to their acronym. However, process areas can be grouped according to maturity levels or process area categories.

 Maturity Levels: CMMI for Development 
There are Five maturity levels. However, maturity level ratings are awarded for levels 2 through 5. The process areas below and their maturity levels are listed for the CMMI for Development model:

Maturity Level 2 - Managed
 CM - Configuration Management
 MA - Measurement and Analysis
 PMC - Project Monitoring and Control
 PP - Project Planning
 PPQA - Process and Product Quality Assurance
 REQM - Requirements Management
 SAM - Supplier Agreement Management

Maturity Level 3 - Defined
 DAR - Decision Analysis and Resolution
 IPM - Integrated Project Management
 OPD - Organizational Process Definition
 OPF - Organizational Process Focus
 OT - Organizational Training
 PI - Product Integration
 RD - Requirements Development
 RSKM - Risk Management
 TS - Technical Solution
 VAL - Validation
 VER - Verification

Maturity Level 4 - Quantitatively Managed
 OPP - Organizational Process Performance
 QPM - Quantitative Project Management

Maturity Level 5 - Optimizing
 CAR - Causal Analysis and Resolution
 OPM - Organizational Performance Management

 Maturity Levels: CMMI for Services 
The process areas below and their maturity levels are listed for the CMMI for Services model:

Maturity Level 2 - Managed 
 CM - Configuration Management
 MA - Measurement and Analysis
 PPQA - Process and Product Quality Assurance
 REQM - Requirements Management
 SAM - Supplier Agreement Management
 SD - Service Delivery
 WMC - Work Monitoring and Control
 WP - Work Planning

Maturity Level 3 - Defined (this includes the process areas that make up the previous levels; Maturity Level 3 is made up of the process areas in Level 2 and Level 3)
 CAM - Capacity and Availability Management
 DAR - Decision Analysis and Resolution
 IRP - Incident Resolution and Prevention
 IWM - Integrated Work Management
 OPD - Organizational Process Definition
 OPF - Organizational Process Focus
 OT - Organizational Training
 RSKM - Risk Management
 SCON - Service Continuity
 SSD - Service System Development
 SST - Service System Transition
 STSM - Strategic Service Management

Maturity Level 4 - Quantitatively Managed
 OPP - Organizational Process Performance
 QPM - Quantitative Work Management

Maturity Level 5 - Optimizing
 CAR - Causal Analysis and Resolution
 OPM - Organizational Performance Management

 Maturity Levels: CMMI for Acquisition 
The process areas below and their maturity levels are listed for the CMMI for Acquisition model:

Maturity Level 2 - Managed
 AM - Agreement Management
 ARD - Acquisition Requirements Development
 CM - Configuration Management
 MA - Measurement and Analysis
 PMC - Project Monitoring and Control
 PP - Project Planning
 PPQA - Process and Product Quality Assurance
 REQM - Requirements Management
 SSAD - Solicitation and Supplier Agreement Development

Maturity Level 3 - Defined
 ATM - Acquisition Technical Management
 AVAL - Acquisition Validation
 AVER - Acquisition Verification
 DAR - Decision Analysis and Resolution
 IPM - Integrated Project Management
 OPD - Organizational Process Definition
 OPF - Organizational Process Focus
 OT - Organizational Training
 RSKM - Risk Management.

Maturity Level 4 - Quantitatively Managed
 OPP - Organizational Process Performance
 QPM - Quantitative Project Management

Maturity Level 5 - Optimizing
 CAR - Casual Analysis and Resolution
 OPM - Organizational Performance Management

 Goals and Practices 
There are two categories of goals and practices: generic and specific. Specific goals and practices are specific to a process area. Generic goals and practices are a part of every process area. A process area is satisfied when organizational processes cover all of the generic and specific goals and practices for that process area.

 Generic Goals and Practices 
Generic goals and practices are a part of every process area.

 GG 1 Achieve Specific Goals
 GP 1.1 Perform Specific Practices
 GG 2 Institutionalize a Managed Process
 GP 2.1 Establish an Organizational Policy
 GP 2.2 Plan the Process
 GP 2.3 Provide Resources
 GP 2.4 Assign Responsibility
 GP 2.5 Train People
 GP 2.6 Control Work Products
 GP 2.7 Identify and Involve Relevant Stakeholders
 GP 2.8 Monitor and Control the Process
 GP 2.9 Objectively Evaluate Adherence
 GP 2.10 Review Status with Higher Level Management
 GG 3 Institutionalize a Defined Process
 GP 3.1 Establish a Defined Process
 GP 3.2 Collect Process Related Experiences

 Specific Goals and Practices 

Each process area is defined by a set of goals and practices. These goals and practices appear only in that process area.

 Process Areas 
CMMI for Development, Version 1.2 contains 22 process areas indicating the aspects of product and service development that are to be covered by organizational processes. For a summary of process areas for each model, see these quick reference documents available on the SEI website:
 CMMI for Acquisition 
 CMMI for Development 
 CMMI for Services 

 Agreement Management (AM) 
 A Project Management process area at Maturity Level 2

Purpose

The purpose of Agreement Management (AM) is to ensure that the supplier and the acquirer perform according to the terms of the supplier agreement. 

Specific Practices by Goal

 SG 1 Satisfy Supplier Agreements
 SP 1.1 Execute the Supplier Agreement
 SP 1.2 Monitor Selected Supplier Processes
 SP 1.3 Accept the Acquired Product
 SP 1.4 Manage Supplier Invoices

 Capacity and Availability Management (CAM) 
 A Support process area at Maturity Level 3

Purpose

The purpose of Capacity and Availability Management (CAM) is to ensure effective service system performance and
ensure that resources are provided and used effectively to support service requirements.

Specific Practices by Goal

 SG 1 Prepare for Capacity and Availability Management
 SP 1.1 Establish a Capacity and Availability Management Strategy
 SP 1.2 Select Measures and Analytic Techniques
 SP 1.3 Establish Service System Representations
 SG 2 Monitor and Analyze Capacity and Availability
 SP 2.1 Monitor and Analyze Capacity
 SP 2.2 Monitor and Analyze Availability
 SP 2.3 Report Capacity and Availability Management Data

 Causal Analysis and Resolution (CAR) 
 A Support process area at Maturity Level 5

Purpose

The purpose of Causal Analysis and Resolution (CAR) is to identify causes of selected outcomes and take action to improve process performance.

Specific Practices by Goal

 SG 1 Determine Causes of Selected Outcomes
 SP 1.1 Select Outcomes for Analysis
 SP 1.2 Analyze Causes
 SG 2 Address Causes of Selected Outcomes
 SP 2.1 Implement Action Proposals
 SP 2.2 Evaluate the Effect of Implemented Actions
 SP 2.3 Record Causal Analysis Data

 Configuration Management (CM) 
 A Support process area at Maturity Level 2

Purpose

The purpose of Configuration Management (CM) is to establish and maintain the integrity of work products using configuration identification, configuration control, configuration status accounting, and configuration audits.

Specific Practices by Goal

 SG 1 Establish Baselines
 SP 1.1 Identify Configuration Items
 SP 1.2 Establish a Configuration Management System
 SP 1.3 Create or Release Baselines
 SG 2 Track and Control Changes
 SP 2.1 Track Change Requests
 SP 2.2 Control Configuration Items
 SG 3 Establish Integrity
 SP 3.1 Establish Configuration Management Records
 SP 3.2 Perform Configuration Audits

 Decision Analysis and Resolution (DAR) 
 A Support process area at Maturity Level 3

Purpose

The purpose of Decision Analysis and Resolution (DAR) is to analyze possible decisions using a formal evaluation process that evaluates identified alternatives against established criteria.

Specific Practices by Goal

 SG 1 Evaluate Alternatives
 SP 1.1 Establish Guidelines for Decision Analysis
 SP 1.2 Establish Evaluation Criteria
 SP 1.3 Identify Alternative Solutions
 SP 1.4 Select Evaluation Methods
 SP 1.5 Evaluate Alternative Solutions
 SP 1.6 Select Solutions

 Integrated Project Management (IPM) 
 A Project Management process area at Maturity Level 3

Purpose

The purpose of Integrated Project Management (IPM) is to establish and manage the project and the involvement of relevant stakeholders according to an integrated and defined process that is tailored from the organization's set of standard processes.

Specific Practices by Goal

 SG 1 Use the Project's Defined Process
 SP 1.1 Establish the Project's Defined Process
 SP 1.2 Use Organizational Process Assets for Planning Project Activities
 SP 1.3 Establish the Project's Work Environment
 SP 1.4 Integrate Plans
 SP 1.5 Manage the Project Using the Integrated Plans
 SP 1.6 Establish Teams
 SP 1.7 Contribute to Organizational Process Assets
 SG 2 Coordinate and Collaborate with Relevant Stakeholders
 SP 2.1 Manage Stakeholder Involvement
 SP 2.2 Manage Dependencies
 SP 2.3 Resolve Coordination Issues

 Measurement and Analysis (MA) 
 A Support process area at Maturity Level 2

Purpose

The purpose of Measurement and Analysis (MA) is to develop and sustain a measurement capability used to support management information needs.

Specific Practices by Goal

 SG 1 Align Measurement and Analysis Activities
 SP 1.1 Establish Measurement Objectives
         Resources, People, Facilities and Techniques.
 SP 1.2 Specify Measures
          Information Needs Document, Guidance, Reference and Reporting.
 SP 1.3 Specify Data Collection and Storage Procedures
          Sources,  Methods, Frequency and Owners.
 SP 1.4 Specify Analysis Procedures
          Rules, Alarms, SPC and Variance.
 SG 2 Provide Measurement Results
 SP 2.1 Obtain Measurement Data
          Actual, Plan, Automatic and Manual.
 SP 2.2 Analyze Measurement Data
          Evaluate, Drill Down, RCA.
 SP 2.3 Store Data and Results
          Store, Secure, Accessible, History and Evidence.
 SP 2.4 Communicate Results
          Information Sharing, Dash Boards, Up to Date, Simple and Interpret.

 Organizational Process Definition (OPD) 
 A Process Management process area at Maturity Level 3

Purpose

The purpose of Organizational Process Definition (OPD) is to establish and maintain a usable set of organizational process assets, work environment standards, and rules and guidelines for teams.

Specific Practices by Goal

 SG 1 Establish Organizational Process Assets
 SP 1.1 Establish Standard Processes
 SP 1.2 Establish Lifecycle Model Descriptions
 SP 1.3 Establish Tailoring Criteria and Guidelines
 SP 1.4 Establish the Organization's Measurement Repository
 SP 1.5 Establish the Organization's Process Asset Library
 SP 1.6 Establish Work Environment Standards
 SP 1.7 Establish Rules and Guidelines for Teams

 Organizational Process Focus (OPF) 
 A Process Management process area at Maturity Level 3

Purpose

The purpose of Organizational Process Focus (OPF) is to plan, implement, and deploy organizational process improvements based on a thorough understanding of current strengths and weaknesses of the organization's processes and process assets.

Specific Practices by Goal

 SG 1 Determine Process Improvement Opportunities
 SP 1.1 Establish Organizational Process Needs
 SP 1.2 Appraise the Organization's Processes
 SP 1.3 Identify the Organization's Process Improvements
 SG 2 Plan and Implement Process Improvements
 SP 2.1 Establish Process Action Plans
 SP 2.2 Implement Process Action Plans
 SG 3 Deploy Organizational Process Assets and Incorporate Experiences
 SP 3.1 Deploy Organizational Process Assets
 SP 3.2 Deploy Standard Processes
 SP 3.3 Monitor the Implementation
 SP 3.4 Incorporate Experiences into Organizational Process Assets

 Organizational Performance Management (OPM) / Organizational Innovation and Deployment 
 A Process Management process area at Maturity Level 5

Purpose

The purpose of Organizational Performance Management (OPM) is to proactively manage the organization's performance to meet its business objectives.

Specific Practices by Goal

 SG 1 Manage Business Performance
 SP 1.1 Maintain Business Objectives
 SP 1.2 Analyze Process Performance Data
 SP 1.3 Identify Potential Areas for Improvement
 SG 2 Select Improvements
 SP 2.1 Elicit Suggested Improvements
 SP 2.2 Analyze Suggested Improvements
 SP 2.3 Validate Improvements
 SP 2.4 Select and Implement Improvements for Deployment
 SG 3 Deploy Improvements
 SP 3.1 Plan the Deployment
 SP 3.2 Manage the Deployment
 SP 3.3 Evaluate Improvement Effects

 Organizational Process Performance (OPP) 
 A Process Management process area at Maturity Level 4

Purpose

The purpose of Organizational Process Performance (OPP) is to establish and maintain a quantitative understanding of the performance of selected processes in the organization's set of standard processes in support of achieving quality and process performance objectives, and to provide process performance data, baselines, and models to quantitatively manage the organization's projects.

Specific Practices by Goal

 SG 1 Establish Performance Baselines and Models
 SP 1.1 Establish Quality and Process Performance Objectives
 SP 1.2 Select Processes
 SP 1.3 Establish Process Performance Measures
 SP 1.4 Analyze Process Performance and Establish Process Performance Baselines
 SP 1.5 Establish Process Performance Models

 Organizational Training (OT) 
 A Process Management process area at Maturity Level 3

Purpose

The purpose of Organizational Training (OT) is to develop skills and knowledge of people so they can perform their roles effectively and efficiently.

Specific Practices by Goal

 SG 1 Establish an Organizational Training Capability
 SP 1.1 Establish Strategic Training Needs
 SP 1.2 Determine Which Training Needs Are the Responsibility of the Organization
 SP 1.3 Establish an Organizational Training Tactical Plan
 SP 1.4 Establish a Training Capability
 SG 2 Provide Training
 SP 2.1 Deliver Training
 SP 2.2 Establish Training Records
 SP 2.3 Assess Training Effectiveness

 Product Integration (PI) 
 An Engineering process area at Maturity Level 3

Purpose

The purpose of Product Integration (PI) is to assemble the product from the product components, ensure that the product, as integrated, behaves properly (i.e., possesses the required functionality and quality attributes), and deliver the product.

Specific Practices by Goal

 SG 1 Prepare for Product Integration
 SP 1.1 Establish an Integration Strategy
 SP 1.2 Establish the Product Integration Environment
 SP 1.3 Establish Product Integration Procedures and Criteria
 SG 2 Ensure Interface Compatibility
 SP 2.1 Review Interface Descriptions for Completeness
 SP 2.2 Manage Interfaces
 SG 3 Assemble Product Components and Deliver the Product
 SP 3.1 Confirm Readiness of Product Components for Integration
 SP 3.2 Assemble Product Components
 SP 3.3 Evaluate Assembled Product Components
 SP 3.4 Package and Deliver the Product or Product Component

 Project Monitoring and Control (PMC) 
 A Project Management process area at Maturity Level 2

Purpose

The purpose of Project Monitoring and Control (PMC) is to provide an understanding of the project's progress so that appropriate corrective actions can be taken when the project's performance deviates significantly from the plan.

Specific Practices by Goal

 SG 1 Monitor the Project Against the Plan
 SP 1.1 Monitor Project Planning Parameters
 SP 1.2 Monitor Commitments
 SP 1.3 Monitor Project Risks
 SP 1.4 Monitor Data Management
 SP 1.5 Monitor Stakeholder Involvement
 SP 1.6 Conduct Progress Reviews
 SP 1.7 Conduct Milestone Reviews
 SG 2 Manage Corrective Action to Closure
 SP 2.1 Analyze Issues
 SP 2.2 Take Corrective Action
 SP 2.3 Manage Corrective Actions

 Project Planning (PP) 
 A Project Management process area at Maturity Level 2

Purpose

The purpose of Project Planning (PP) is to establish and maintain plans that define project activities.

Specific Practices by Goal

 SG 1 Establish Estimates
 SP 1.1 Estimate the Scope of the Project
 SP 1.2 Establish Estimates of Work Product and Task Attributes
 SP 1.3 Define Project Lifecycle Phases
 SP 1.4 Estimate Effort and Cost
 SG 2 Develop a Project Plan
 SP 2.1 Establish the Budget and Schedule
 SP 2.2 Identify Project Risks
 SP 2.3 Plan Data Management
 SP 2.4 Plan the Project's Resources
 SP 2.5 Plan Needed Knowledge and Skills
 SP 2.6 Plan Stakeholder Involvement
 SP 2.7 Establish the Project Plan
 SG 3 Obtain Commitment to the Plan
 SP 3.1 Review Plans that Affect the Project
 SP 3.2 Reconcile Work and Resource Levels
 SP 3.3 Obtain Plan Commitment

 Process and Product Quality Assurance (PPQA) 
 A Support process area at Maturity Level 2

Purpose

The purpose of Process and Product Quality Assurance (PPQA) is to provide staff and management with objective insight into processes and associated work products.Specific Practices by Goal SG 1 Objectively Evaluate Processes and Work Products
 SP 1.1 Objectively Evaluate Processes
 SP 1.2 Objectively Evaluate Work Products
 SG 2 Provide Objective Insight
 SP 2.1 Communicate and Resolve Noncompliance Issues
 SP 2.2 Establish Records.

 Quantitative Project Management (QPM) 
 A Project Management process area at Maturity Level 4PurposeThe purpose of the Quantitative Project Management (QPM) process area is to quantitatively manage the project to achieve the project's established quality and process performance objectives.Specific Practices by Goal SG 1 Prepare for Quantitative Management
 SP 1.1 Establish the Project's Objectives
 SP 1.2 Compose the Defined Processes
 SP 1.3 Select Subprocesses and Attributes
 SP 1.4 Select Measures and Analytic Techniques
 SG 2 Quantitatively Manage the Project
 SP 2.1 Monitor the Performance of Selected Subprocesses
 SP 2.2 Manage Project Performance
 SP 2.3 Perform Root Cause Analysis

 Requirements Development (RD) 
 An Engineering process area at Maturity Level 3.PurposeThe purpose of Requirements Development (RD) is to elicit, analyze, and establish customer, product, and product component requirements.Specific Practices by Goal SG 1 Develop Customer Requirements
 SP 1.1 Elicit Needs
 SP 1.2 Transform Stakeholder Needs into Customer Requirements
 SG 2 Develop Product Requirements
 SP 2.1 Establish Product and Product Component Requirements
 SP 2.2 Allocate Product Component Requirements
 SP 2.3 Identify Interface Requirements
SG 3 Analyze and Validate Requirements
 SP 3.1 Establish Operational Concepts and Scenarios
 SP 3.2 Establish a Definition of Required Functionality and Quality Attributes
 SP 3.3 Analyze Requirements
 SP 3.4 Analyze Requirements to Achieve Balance
 SP 3.5 Validate Requirements

 Requirements Management (REQM) 
 A Project Management process area at Maturity Level 2PurposeThe purpose of Requirements Management (REQM) is to manage requirements of the project's products and product components and to ensure alignment between those requirements and the project's plans and work products.Specific Practices by Goal SG 1 Manage Requirements
 SP 1.1 Understand Requirements
 SP 1.2 Obtain Commitment to Requirements
 SP 1.3 Manage Requirements Changes
 SP 1.4 Maintain Bidirectional Traceability of Requirements
 SP 1.5 Ensure Alignment Between Project Work and Requirements

 Risk Management (RSKM) 
 A Project Management process area at Maturity Level 3PurposeThe purpose of Risk Management (RSKM) is to identify potential problems before they occur so that risk handling activities can be planned and invoked as needed across the life of the product or project to mitigate adverse impacts on achieving objectives.Specific Practices by Goal SG 1 Prepare for Risk Management
 SP 1.1 Determine Risk Sources and Categories
 SP 1.2 Define Risk Parameters
 SP 1.3 Establish a Risk Management Strategy
 SG 2 Identify and Analyze Risks
 SP 2.1 Identify Risks
 SP 2.2 Evaluate, Categorize, and Prioritize Risks
 SG 3 Mitigate Risks
 SP 3.1 Develop Risk Mitigation Plans
 SP 3.2 Implement Risk Mitigation Plans

 Supplier Agreement Management (SAM) 
 A Project Management process area at Maturity Level 2PurposeThe purpose of Supplier Agreement Management (SAM) is to manage the acquisition of products from suppliers.Specific Practices by Goal SG 1 Establish Supplier Agreements
 SP 1.1 Determine Acquisition Type
 SP 1.2 Select Suppliers
 SP 1.3 Establish Supplier Agreements
 SG 2 Satisfy Supplier Agreements
 SP 2.1 Execute the Supplier Agreement
 SP 2.2 Accept the Acquired Product
 SP 2.3 Ensure Transition of Products

 Technical Solution (TS) 
 An Engineering process area at Maturity Level 3PurposeThe purpose of Technical Solution (TS) is to select design and implement solutions to requirements. Solutions, designs, and implementations encompass products, product components, and product related lifecycle processes either singly or in combination as appropriate.Specific Practices by Goal SG 1 Select Product Component Solutions
 SP 1.1 Develop Alternative Solutions and Selection Criteria
 SP 1.2 Select Product Component Solutions
 SG 2 Develop the Design
 SP 2.1 Design the Product or Product Component
 SP 2.2 Establish a Technical Data Package
 SP 2.3 Design Interfaces Using Criteria
 SP 2.4 Perform Make, Buy or Reuse Analyses
 SG 3 Implement the Product Design
 SP 3.1 Implement the Design
 SP 3.2 Develop Product Support Documentation

 Validation (VAL) 
 An Engineering process area at Maturity Level 3PurposeThe purpose of Validation (VAL) is to demonstrate that a product or product component fulfills its intended use when placed in its intended environment.Specific Practices by Goal SG 1 Prepare for Validation
 SP 1.1 Select Products for Validation
 SP 1.2 Establish the Validation Environment
 SP 1.3 Establish Validation Procedures and Criteria
 SG 2 Validate Product or Product Components
 SP 2.1 Perform Validation
 SP 2.2 Analyze Validation Results

 Verification (VER) 
 An Engineering process area at Maturity Level 3PurposeThe purpose of Verification (VER) is to ensure that selected work products meet their specified requirements.Specific Practices by Goal'

 SG 1 Prepare for Verification
 SP 1.1 Select Work Products for Verification
 SP 1.2 Establish the Verification Environment
 SP 1.3 Establish Verification Procedures and Criteria
 SG 2 Perform Peer Reviews
 SP 2.1 Prepare for Peer Reviews
 SP 2.2 Conduct Peer Reviews
 SP 2.3 Analyze Peer Review Data
 SG 3 Verify Selected Work Products
 SP 3.1 Perform Verification
 SP 3.2 Analyze Verification Results

Changes made in Version 1.2 
Only changes made to the set of Process Areas are considered here. For more information about the changes made to Version 1.2, see the Version 1.2 Release Notes or for the definitive list of changes, take the CMMI Version 1.2 Upgrade Training.

 The following Process Areas have been removed (all on Maturity Level 3):
 Organisational Environment for Integration (OEI)
 Integrated Teaming (IT)
 Integrated Supplier Management (ISM)
 The following additions have been made within existing Process Areas:
 IPM – SG3 and SG4 were eliminated, new SG3 was added (as an IPPD addition)
 OPD – SG2 was added (as an IPPD addition)
 OPF – two SPs were extracted from the old SG3 and combined with two new SPs to create the new SG3
 REQD – SP3.5 was renamed Validate Requirements
 SAM – SP2.1 was eliminated, two new SPs added in SG2
 TS – SP1.2 was incorporated into RD SP 3.1
 VER – SP3.2 was renamed Analyze Verification Results

Changes made in Version 1.3 
Some significant improvements in CMMI-DEV, V1.3 include the following:
 High maturity process areas are significantly improved to reflect industry best practices, including a new specific goal and several new specific practices in the process area that was renamed from Organizational Innovation and Deployment (OID) to Organizational Performance Management (OPM).
 Agile practices have been included with an interpretation guideline and by adding notes to the applicable process areas in the introduction of the process area and on how to interpret agile practices.
 Improvements were made to the model architecture that simplify the use of multiple models.
 Informative material was improved, including revising the engineering practices to reflect industry best practice and adding guidance for organizations that use Agile methods.
 Glossary definitions and model terminology were improved to enhance the clarity, accuracy, and usability of the model.
 Level 4 and 5 generic goals and practices were eliminated as well as capability levels 4 and 5 to appropriately focus high maturity on the achievement of business objectives, which is accomplished by applying capability level 1-3 to the high maturity process areas (Causal Analysis and Resolution, Quantitative Project Management, Organizational Performance Management, and Organizational Process Performance).

For a more complete and detailed list of improvements, see http://www.sei.cmu.edu/cmmi/tools/cmmiv1-3/comparison.cfm. An overview of the changes is described in http://www.benlinders.com/2011/cmmi-v1-3-summing-up/.

Process Areas, Categories, and Maturity Levels 
Table: Process Areas, Categories, and Maturity Levels

References

Official sources

 Capability Maturity Model
 Capability Maturity Model Integration

Further reading 
 

 

Maturity models